Sheila Ann Echols (born October 2, 1964) is a retired track and field athlete from the United States who competed in the 100 metres and the long jump. She won a gold medal at the 1988 Olympic Games in the 4 x 100 m relay. She also won the 1989 IAAF World Cup 100 m title.

Career
Echols was born in Memphis, Tennessee, USA. At the 1988 Olympic Games in Seoul, South Korea, she won a gold medal in the 4 x 100 metres relay, alongside teammates Alice Brown, 100 m gold medalist Florence Griffith Joyner and 100 m silver medalist Evelyn Ashford. They ran 41.98 seconds. She was also an international long jumper and competed in that event at two Olympics. In Seoul, she failed to qualify for the final, placing 16th with a jump of 6.37m. In 1992, at the Olympic Games in Barcelona, she placed 7th in the final with a jump of 6.62m. She won a silver medal in the sprint relay at the 1993 World Championships, where she ran in the heats but not the final. Her biggest individual success came when she won the 1989 World Cup 100 metres title ahead of Mary Onyali and Reigning World Champion Silke Gladisch-Moller. Her 100 metres personal best of 10.83 was achieved at the 1988 US Olympic Trials.

Echols ran track collegiately at Louisiana State University.

Personal bests
 Long jump — 6.94m (1987)
 100 metres — 10.83 (1988)

References

 

1964 births
Living people
American female sprinters
American female long jumpers
Athletes (track and field) at the 1988 Summer Olympics
Athletes (track and field) at the 1992 Summer Olympics
Olympic gold medalists for the United States in track and field
Athletes (track and field) at the 1987 Pan American Games
Pan American Games gold medalists for the United States
Sportspeople from Memphis, Tennessee
Track and field athletes from Tennessee
LSU Lady Tigers track and field athletes
Medalists at the 1988 Summer Olympics
World Athletics Championships medalists
Pan American Games medalists in athletics (track and field)
Goodwill Games medalists in athletics
USA Outdoor Track and Field Championships winners
Competitors at the 1990 Goodwill Games
Medalists at the 1987 Pan American Games
20th-century American women